Dodge is an unincorporated community in Garfield County, in the Palouse region of southeastern Washington. It is located at the junction of U.S. Route 12 and State Route 127, northwest of Pomeroy.

References

Unincorporated communities in Garfield County, Washington
Unincorporated communities in Washington (state)